Luigi Secchi (1853 in Cremona – 1921 in Miazzina) was an Italian sculptor.

Biography

He was born in Cremona, but resided during his career mostly in Milan. He was initially a pupil of Pietro Magni, and then of Francesco Barzaghi at the Brera Academy.

He worked on statues in bronze and marble. He exhibited in 1883 in Milan, a bronze statue titled: Modello in Riposo. His work Bel mattino was awarded at the 1883 Girotti competition. In 1884, in Turin, he exhibited a model for In Repose. In 1886 in Milan, he exhibited this statue in marble. 
 He was commissioned a number of monuments in and around Milan. These include the Monument to the poet Giuseppe Parini, (1899) at the piazza Cordusio,  Milan. The base was completed with Antonio Beltrami and inaugurated on the centenary of the writer's death. One of his masterworks is his monument to Verdi made for town where the composer lived.

Gallery

References

1853 births
1921 deaths
Artists from Cremona
Brera Academy alumni
20th-century Italian sculptors
20th-century Italian male artists
19th-century Italian sculptors
Italian male sculptors
Sculptors from Lombardy
19th-century Italian male artists